In military parlance, the rear is the part of concentration of military forces that is farthest from the enemy (compare its antonym, the front).  The rear typically contains all logistic and management elements of the force necessary to support the front line forces — supply depots, ammunition dumps, field hospitals, machine shops, planning/communication facilities, and command headquarters, as well as infrastructures such as roads, bridges, airfields, dockyards, and railway depots.

See also
 Rear admiral
 Rearguard

References

Land warfare